Raquel Atawo and Abigail Spears are the defending champions, but lost in the semifinals to Anna-Lena Grönefeld and Květa Peschke.

Kiki Bertens and Johanna Larsson won the title, defeating Grönefeld and Peschke in the final, 4–6, 6–2, [10–7].

Seeds

Draw

References
 Main Draw

Generali Ladies Linz - Doubles
Generali Ladies Linz Doubles